"Man to Man" is a song written by Jamie O'Hara and recorded by American country music artist Gary Allan. It was released in September 2002 as the third and final single from Allan's 2001 album Alright Guy. The song became his first number one hit on the U.S. Billboard Hot Country Songs chart in March 2003 and peaked at number 25 on the Billboard Hot 100.

Content
The song's narrator tells his significant other's ex-boyfriend that it was his fault that she had left him and that it's too late to get her back. He states that they should have a conversation "man to man."

Critical reception
Rick Cohoon of Allmusic in his review, states that the lyrics are "harsh and realistic" but "maybe a bit too glib for Allan’s good." Cohoon states that "‘You want her back, and it’s too late/why don’t we call a spade a spade’ summarizes the song’s tone, but comes across as too abrasive." He states that the writing makes it seem like the situation could have happened to the writer, Jamie O'Hara.

Chart positions
"Man to Man" debuted at number 45 on the U.S. Billboard Hot Country Songs for the week of October 5, 2002.

Year-end charts

References

2002 singles
2001 songs
Gary Allan songs
Song recordings produced by Tony Brown (record producer)
Songs written by Jamie O'Hara (singer)
MCA Nashville Records singles
Song recordings produced by Mark Wright (record producer)
MCA Records singles